Healdsburg is a city located in Sonoma County, in California's Wine Country. At the 2010 census, the city had a population of 11,254. Owing to its three most important wine-producing regions (the Russian River, Dry Creek, and Alexander Valley AVAs), Healdsburg has been continuously awarded one of the top 10 small towns in America and is home to three of the top wineries in the United States.

Healdsburg is centered on a 19th-century plaza that provides an important focal point for tourists and locals.

History

Early inhabitants of the local area included the Pomo people, who constructed villages in open areas along the Russian River. Anglo-American and Russian settlement may have commenced in the mid-19th century, with a settlement nearby, established downstream along the Russian River near Graton, in 1836, and later the Rancho Sotoyome land grant, in 1844.

In 1857, Harmon Heald, an Ohio businessman who had been squatting on Rancho Sotoyome since 1850, purchased part of the rancho—giving the city its official founding date. In 1867, Heald's eponymous small town was incorporated. Healdsburg is located within the former township of Mendocino.  The San Francisco and North Pacific Railroad reached Healdsburg in 1872.

The Healdsburg Carnegie Library, now the Healdsburg Museum, is listed on the National Register of Historic Places, as is the Healdsburg Memorial Bridge.

The City Council of Healdsburg has identified 13 important Historic Structures and Districts.

Farming, especially orchards and truck farms, was common within the present city limits from at least the 1890s to 1940s.

Geography
The total area is 0.15% water.
It lies on the Russian River, near a point used as a crossing of the river since the 1850s that is now the site of the Healdsburg Memorial Bridge.

Foss Creek traverses the city from north to south, flowing into Dry Creek near the U.S. 101 Central Healdsburg interchange.

Climate
Healdsburg has cool, wet winters and warm to hot, dry summers.

Annual precipitation averages . There are an average of 73 days annually with measurable precipitation. Snow is relatively rare, with none in most years. The highest yearly snowfall totaled  in 1976.

Environment
An intrinsic element of the city's natural environment is the riparian zone associated with the Russian River that flows through Healdsburg. The city owns two open space reserves stewarded by LandPaths. The Healdsburg Ridge Open Space Preserve has  of wetlands, oak woodlands, chaparral, and grasslands, while the Fitch Mountain Open Space Preserve has . City residents support recycling by use of the Healdsburg Transfer Station. The city has shown an interest in creating a quiet environment by creating a Noise Element of the General Plan, which defines baseline sound level contours and sets forth standards of quiet for each land use category.

Demographics

2010
At the 2010 census Healdsburg had a population of 11,254. The racial makeup of Healdsburg was 8,334 (74.1%) White, 56 (0.5%) African American, 205 (1.8%) Native American, 125 (1.1%) Asian, 18 (0.2%) Pacific Islander, 2,133 (19.0%) from other races, and 383 (3.4%) from two or more races. Hispanic or Latino of any race were 3,820 persons (33.9%).

The census reported that 99.5% of the population lived in households and 0.5% were institutionalized.

There were 4,378 households, 1,335 (30.5%) had children under the age of 18 living in them, 2,140 (48.9%) were opposite-sex married couples living together, 465 (10.6%) had a female householder with no husband present, 222 (5.1%) had a male householder with no wife present.  There were 259 (5.9%) unmarried opposite-sex partnerships, and 54 (1.2%) same-sex married couples or partnerships. Of the households, 1,205 (27.5%) were one person and 542 (12.4%) had someone living alone who was 65 or older. The average household size was 2.56.  There were 2,827 families (64.6% of households); the average family size was 3.12.

The age distribution was 2,546 people (22.6%) under the age of 18, 925 people (8.2%) aged 18 to 24, 2,750 people (24.4%) aged 25 to 44, 3,349 people (29.8%) aged 45 to 64, and 1,684 people (15.0%) who were 65 or older.  The median age was 40.8 years. For every 100 females, there were 96.5 males.  For every 100 females age 18 and over, there were 93.0 males.

The homeowner vacancy rate was 2.7%; the rental vacancy rate was 4.2%. Of the population, 53.2% lived in owner-occupied housing units and 46.3% lived in rental housing units.

2000
As of the 2000 census, there were 10,722 people in 3,968 households, including 2,702 families, in the city. The population density was 2,848/sq mi (1,101/km). The racial makeup of the city was 79.9% White, 0.5% African American, 1.8% Native American, 0.8% Asian, 0.1% Pacific Islander, 13.4% from other races, and 3.5% from two or more races. Of the population, 28.8% were Hispanic or Latino of any race.

There were 3,968 households, 33.0% had children under the age of 18 living with them, 52.2% were married couples living together, 11.4% had a female householder with no husband present, and 31.9% were non-families. 25.9% of households were made up of individuals, and 12.1% had someone living alone who was 65 or older. The average household size was 2.69 and the average family size was 3.23.

The age distribution was 26.0% under the age of 18, 8.9% from 18 to 24, 26.5% from 25 to 44, 24.5% from 45 to 64, and 14.1% who were 65 or older. The median age was 37 years. For every 100 females, there were 95.0 males. For every 100 females age 18 and over, there were 90.8 males.

The median household income was $48,995 and the median family income was $55,386. Males had a median income of $38,977 versus $32,015 for females. The per capita income for the city was $22,245. 9.4% of the population and 6.6% of families were below the poverty line. Out of the total population, 10.4% of those under the age of 18 and 6.7% of those 65 and older were living below the poverty line.

Government

State and federal 

According to the California Secretary of State, as of February 10, 2019, Healdsburg has 6,913 registered voters. Of those, 3,624 (52.4%) are registered Democrats, 1,262 (18.3%) are registered Republicans, and 1,680 (24.3%) have declined to state a political party.

Transportation
Amtrak Thruway and Sonoma County Transit buses serve the Depot. Healdsburg is a proposed future stop on the Sonoma–Marin Area Rail Transit commuter rail line.

Notable people

 Mary Ellen Bamford: author
 Kristen Barnhisel, winemaker
 Helen Beardsley: author
 Raymond Burr: actor
 Jim Cullom: professional football player
 L Peter Deutsch: creator of Ghostscript
 Paul Erdman: business and financial writer
 Henry D. Fitch: early resident
 Jess Jackson: wine entrepreneur
 Roderick N. Matheson: early resident
 Patti McCarty: actress
 Mike McGuire: politician
 Heidi Newfield: country singer, formerly of Trick Pony
 Thomas C. Reed: former Secretary of the Air Force
 Ariana Richards: actress and painter
 Effie Robinson: social worker and public housing director
 Ralph Rose: track and field athlete, Olympic gold medalist in 1904-08-12
 Jack Sonni: former guitarist of Dire Straits
 John Udell: diarist of the American frontier
 John Carl Warnecke: architect
 Hazel Hotchkiss Wightman: tennis player, Wimbledon and Olympic champion
 Jim Wood: politician

See also

 Category:Healdsburg, California
 List of cities and towns in California
 List of cities and towns in the San Francisco Bay Area
 Madrona Manor
 Honor Mansion
 Sonoma County wine
 Wine Country (California)

References

External links

 
 Healdsburg Visitor's Bureau
 

 
1867 establishments in California
California wine
Cities in Sonoma County, California
Cities in the San Francisco Bay Area
Incorporated cities and towns in California
Populated places established in 1857
Populated places established in 1867